Svyatogorye is a rural locality (a selo) in Staroselskoye Rural Settlement, Mezhdurechensky District, Vologda Oblast, Russia. The population was 99 as of 2002. There are 4 streets.

Geography 
Svyatogorye is located 24 km southwest of Shuyskoye (the district's administrative centre) by road. Vysokovo is the nearest rural locality.

References 

Rural localities in Mezhdurechensky District, Vologda Oblast